Osmitopsis afra is an Osmitopsis species in the tribe Anthemideae. It is native to South Africa.

References

Flora of South Africa
Anthemideae
Plants described in 1972